The Royal School of Church Music (RSCM) is a Christian music education organisation dedicated to the promotion of music in Christian worship, in particular the repertoire and traditions of Anglican church music, largely through publications, training courses and an award scheme. The organisation was founded in England in 1927 by Sir Sydney Nicholson and today it operates internationally, with 8,500 members in over 40 countries worldwide, and is the largest church music organisation in Britain.

The RSCM was originally named the School of English Church Music and was only open to members of the Anglican Communion; today it is an interdenominational organisation, although it is still overseen by the Church of England.

Choirs affiliated with the Royal School of Church Music often wear the RSCM medallion, which features a picture of Saint Nicolas, its patron saint.

History
The School of English Church Music (SECM) was founded in 1927 by Sir Sydney Nicholson, and opened at Buller’s Wood in Chislehurst in 1929. In 1945, it became the Royal School of Church Music (RSCM), and moved to Canterbury Cathedral. In 1954, it moved to Addington Palace and then in 1996 to Cleveland Lodge, Dorking. Since 2006, it has been based at Sarum College in Salisbury.

Activities 
The RSCM seeks to engage and encourage church music through awards, exams, publishing, residential courses and professional advice.

Education programmes include the Voice for Life and Church Music Skills schemes, as well as the long-running residential courses.

The RSCM publishes church music and other materials for choirs and organists, and produces a magazine, Church Music Quarterly (CMQ) which alongside Sunday by Sunday provides useful information for church musicians.

The Millennium Youth Choir is the charity's national youth choir which has sung for BBC Radio 3 Choral Evensong and the Proms. The RSCM Voices and RSCM Cathedral Singers are other choirs run by the RSCM.

Leadership 
 The Director is Hugh Morris (since 2018)
President of the Royal School of Church Music in America is Joseph Causby
President of RSCM Australia is Ross Cobb
President of RSCM South Africa is Malcolm Chalmers
President of RSCM New Zealand is Paul Ellis
The patron was HM The Queen

Directors of the RSCM 
1927–1947 Sydney Nicholson (formerly Organist of Carlisle and Manchester Cathedrals, and Westminster Abbey)

1954–1972 Gerald H. Knight (formerly Assistant Organist of Truro Cathedral)

1972–1989 Lionel Dakers (formerly Organist of Exeter and Ripon Cathedrals)

1989–1998 Harry Bramma (formerly Assistant Organist of Worcester Cathedral and Organist of Southwark Cathedral)

1998–2007 John Harper

2007–2012 Lindsay Gray

2012–2018 Andrew Reid(formerly Master of the Music at Peterborough Cathedral; subsequently Director of Harrison and Harrison)

2018–present Hugh Morris (formerly Organist of Derby Cathedral)

Awards and medals

The RSCM provides a series of grades and awards to signify varying levels of musical achievement. There are four basic merit awards – the light blue ribbon, the dark blue ribbon, the red ribbon and the yellow ribbon. These awards share the same medal.

Beyond these are several medals awarded after successful coursework and examination:

 The Bronze award
 The Silver award
 The Gold award

The prerequisites of the Silver award are to hold either the Bronze award (or its predecessor, the Dean's/Provost's award), to have attended an RSCM event as a member of the choir and it is suggested that the candidate have a Grade 3 Theory (ABRSM) level of understanding.

The prerequisites of the Gold award are once again, to hold the level below, to have completed an RSCM course (preferably residential) and it is suggested that a Grade 5 Theory (ABRSM) level of understanding. The ABRSM Grade 8 Singing is of an approximate level but the Gold award has a larger syllabus and does not require the candidate to commit pieces to memory. Unlike the grade 8, a candidate must also create an order of service for any event he or she wishes, with an appropriate music list.

The new awards are now available to choristers of any age and have been brought in to standardise the awarding process. There are many area based rules for the old medals, which will all disappear as the old award candidates decide not to wear their medals due to age.

Examples include
 in some areas a chorister may wear all medals at the same time while in others there is a limit of one.
 a red ribbon (St Cecilia/Nicolas) may only be worn by those over 18 years in some areas, while other areas the highest medal always has a red ribbon.

The former medals are as follows:

Head Chorister and Deputy Head Chorister medals are also used by some choirs.

Honorary awards 
Every year the RSCM Council confers Honorary Awards on those who have made outstanding contributions to church music. They are divided in:

 Fellow of the RSCM (FRSCM):
 Awarded for achievements in church music and/or liturgy of international significance, or for exceptional musical and/or liturgical work within the RSCM.
 Associate of the RSCM (ARSCM):
 Awarded for achievements in church music and/or liturgy of national significance, or for important musical and/or liturgical work within the RSCM.
 Honorary Member of the RSCM (HonRSCM):
 Awarded for exceptional or very significant work that has contributed to the cause of church music and/or liturgy at international or national levels, or within the RSCM, but which is not primarily musical or liturgical.
 Certificate of Special Service (CERTSS):
 Awarded for significant administrative work as a voluntary officer or member of staff within the RSCM; or an award for a significant contribution to church music and/or liturgy at a local level.

See also

Anglican church music
Choirboy
Christian music
List of Anglican church composers
List of musicians at English cathedrals
Millennium Youth Choir
I will sing with the spirit, anthem composed by John Rutter for the RSCM setting the text of their motto

Further reading 

 John Henderson and Trevor Jarvis, Sydney Nicholson and the College of St Nicolas: The Chislehurst Years, Salisbury: RSCM Press
 John Henderson and Trevor Jarvis, The Royal School of Church Music: The Addington Years - Hardback, Salisbury: RSCM Press
 John Henderson and Trevor Jarvis, Sydney Nicholson & his 'Musings of a Musician'

References

External links 
RSCM
RSCM Canada
RSCM America
RSCM Australia
RSCM New Zealand
RSCM South Africa
RSCM King's College Training Course
RSCM Oxford
RSCM Ireland

1927 establishments in the United Kingdom
Music-related professional associations
Anglican church music
Music education organizations
Music education in the United Kingdom
Music education in the United States
Music education in Canada
Anglican education
Music in Wiltshire
Music publishing companies of the United Kingdom
Publishing companies established in 1927
Sheet music publishing companies